Davis Payne (born September 24, 1970) is a Canadian former professional ice hockey winger who played in the National Hockey League for the Boston Bruins, and is the former head coach of the St. Louis Blues. He was an assistant coach with the Los Angeles Kings, but was fired on April 11, 2017. He is currently an associate coach under D. J. Smith with the Ottawa Senators.

Playing career
Payne was drafted 140th overall by the Edmonton Oilers in the 1989 NHL Entry Draft. He turned pro in 1992 and joined the Greensboro Monarchs of the East Coast Hockey League. He then had spells in the International Hockey League with the Phoenix Roadrunners and the American Hockey League with the Rochester Americans before returning to the Monarchs for a second spell. After playing two games with the Providence Bruins, Payne signed with the Boston Bruins. While spending most of his time playing in Providence, he managed to play 22 games for Boston over two seasons, scoring an assist while collecting 14 penalty minutes. He moved to the San Antonio Dragons before returning to the ECHL to spend his final two seasons with the Greenville Grrrowl. Payne also played for Michigan Technological University in his collegiate career.

Coaching career

ECHL: Pee Dee and Alaska
In 2000, Payne became the head coach of the Pee Dee Pride in the ECHL. Payne coached there through the 2003 season, attaining a regular season record of 104–67–17. The team also made the playoffs all three seasons, advancing to the second round each year. After the 2002–2003 season, Payne began coaching the Alaska Aces (ECHL). Payne coached in Alaska from 2003 to 2007, leading the team to the playoffs every year, including a Kelly Cup Championship in 2005–2006 season. He ended his tenure at the Aces with a regular season record of 185–75–28 and a playoff record of 38–21. Payne is also one of two coaches to lead his team to back-to-back 100-point seasons, winning the Brabham Cup in 2005–06 with 113 points and finishing second in 2006–07 with 105 points.

NHL: St. Louis Blues

On January 2, 2010, Payne was named the interim head coach of the St. Louis Blues following the club's dismissal of Andy Murray.

On April 14, 2010, the St. Louis Blues removed the interim tag from Davis' title, and he became the full-time head coach of the team. He was fired on November 6, 2011, after his team got off to a 6–7 start and was replaced by former Dallas Stars head coach Ken Hitchcock.

NHL assistant coaching career

On July 26, 2012, Los Angeles Kings General Manager Dean Lombardi announced that Davis Payne would be hired as assistant coach to Darryl Sutter.

On July 5, 2017, the Buffalo Sabres announced Payne would be hired as associate coach to Phil Housley.

Career statistics

Regular season and playoffs

NHL coaching record

Personal life
Payne is married to Jane, and has two daughters, Allison and Lydia.

References

External links
 

1970 births
Living people
Boston Bruins players
Buffalo Sabres coaches
Canadian ice hockey coaches
Canadian ice hockey right wingers
Edmonton Oilers draft picks
Greensboro Monarchs players
Greenville Grrrowl players
Ice hockey people from British Columbia
Michigan Tech Huskies men's ice hockey players
New Jersey Rockin' Rollers players
People from Port Alberni
Phoenix Roadrunners (IHL) players
Providence Bruins players
Rochester Americans players
Los Angeles Kings coaches
San Antonio Dragons players
St. Louis Blues coaches